Cape Wheatstone is a bold rock cape that forms the south end of Hallett Peninsula and marks the north entrance to Tucker Inlet, Victoria Land. Discovered in January 1841 by Sir James Clark Ross who named it for Sir Charles Wheatstone, English physicist and inventor.

Headlands of Victoria Land
Borchgrevink Coast